Hermaringen is a municipality in the district of Heidenheim in Baden-Württemberg in southern Germany.

Hermaringen is known as the birthplace of Georg Elser, who tried to assassinate Adolf Hitler on 8 November 1939.

References

External links

 https://web.archive.org/web/20190616153115/http://www.hermaringen.de/

Heidenheim (district)